Emmanuel Jean Candès (born 27 April 1970) is a French statistician. He is a professor of statistics and electrical engineering (by courtesy) at Stanford University, where he is also the Barnum-Simons Chair in Mathematics and Statistics. Candès is a 2017 MacArthur Fellow.

Academic biography
Candès earned a MSc from the École Polytechnique in 1993. He did his postgraduate studies at Stanford, where he earned a PhD in statistics in 1998 under the supervision of David Donoho and immediately joined the Stanford faculty as an assistant professor of statistics. He moved to the California Institute of Technology in 2000, where in 2006 he was named the Ronald and Maxine Linde Professor of Applied and Computational Mathematics. He returned to Stanford in 2009.

Research
Candès' early research concerned nonlinear approximation theory. In his PhD thesis, he developed generalizations of wavelets called curvelets and ridgelets that were able to capture higher order structures in signals. This work has had significant impact in image processing and multiscale analysis, and earned him the Popov prize in approximation theory in 2001.

In 2006, Candès wrote a paper with Australian-American mathematician Terence Tao that spearheaded the field of compressed sensing: the recovery of sparse signals from a few carefully constructed, and seemingly random measurements. Many researchers have since contributed to this field, which has introduced the idea of a camera that can record pictures while needing only one sensor.

Awards and honors
In 2001 Candès received an Alfred P. Sloan Research Fellowship. He was awarded the James H. Wilkinson Prize in Numerical Analysis and Scientific Computing in 2005. In 2006, he received the Vasil A. Popov Prize as well as the National Science Foundation's highest honor: the Alan T. Waterman Award for research described by the NSF as "nothing short of revolutionary".  In 2010 Candès and Terence Tao were awarded the George Pólya Prize.  In 2011, Candès was awarded the ICIAM Collatz Prize. Candès has also received the Lagrange Prize in Continuous Optimization, awarded by the Mathematical Optimization Society (MOS) and the Society for Industrial and Applied Mathematics (SIAM). He was also presented with the Dannie Heineman Prize by the Academy of Sciences at Göttingen in 2013. In 2014 he was elected to the National Academy of Sciences. In 2015 he  received the George David Birkhoff Prize of the AMS / SIAM. He is also a fellow of SIAM. In 2017 Candès received the MacArthur Fellowship for exploring the limits of signal recovery and matrix completion from incomplete data sets with implications for high-impact applications in multiple fields.

He was elected to the 2018 class of fellows of the American Mathematical Society. In 2020, Candès was awarded the Princess of Asturias Award for Technical and Scientific Research.

Personal life
Candès is married to Stanford statistician Chiara Sabatti.

References

External links
Candès' web page at Stanford.

1970 births
Living people
20th-century French mathematicians
21st-century French mathematicians
California Institute of Technology faculty
École Polytechnique alumni
Fellows of the American Mathematical Society
Fellows of the Society for Industrial and Applied Mathematics
French statisticians
MacArthur Fellows
Members of the United States National Academy of Sciences
Scientists from Paris
Sloan Research Fellows
Stanford University alumni
Stanford University Department of Mathematics faculty
Stanford University Department of Statistics faculty
Mathematical statisticians